The episodes from the thirteenth season of the anime series Naruto: Shippuden are based on Part II of the setting of Naruto manga series by Masashi Kishimoto. The episodes are directed by Hayato Date and produced by Pierrot and TV Tokyo. The season focuses on the Fourth Great Ninja War between Naruto Uzumaki and the Hidden Villages' ninja against the forces under the masked ninja Tobi and Kabuto Yakushi. There is also a side story arc. The thirteenth season began airing on August 23, 2012 on TV Tokyo and ended on January 10, 2013. 

The English dubbed version of this season began on January 10, 2015, on Neon Alley. The season would make its English television debut on Adult Swim's Toonami programming block and premiere from November 24, 2019 to May 10, 2020. 

This season contains four musical themes: two openings and two endings. The first opening theme,  by The Cro-Magnons, is used from episode 276 to 281. The second opening theme "Moshimo" by Daisuke is used from episodes 282 to 295.  The first ending theme,  by AISHA, is used from episode 276 to 281. The second ending theme, "MOTHER" by MUCC is used from episodes 282 to 295. The sixth feature film, Road to Ninja: Naruto the Movie, was released on July 28, 2012. The broadcast versions of the episodes 276 to 277 include scenes from the film in the opening themes, while retaining the music "Totsugeki Rock".


Episode list

Home releases

Japanese

English

References
General

Specific

2012 Japanese television seasons
Shippuden Season 13
Shippuden Season 13